Farewell to Marriage (Spanish:Despedida de casada) is a 1968 Mexican film. It was produced by Fernando de Fuentes.

Cast
 Ana Luisa Peluffo
 Elsa Cárdenas
 Mauricio Garcés
 Gracita Morales
 Alfredo Landa

External links
 

1968 films
Mexican comedy films
1960s Spanish-language films
Films directed by Juan de Orduña
1960s Mexican films